Ashly DelGrosso-Costa (born July 9, 1982), known professionally as Ashly Costa, is a professional dancer from Highland, Utah who starred on the ABC television series Dancing with the Stars for the first three seasons and returned March 22, 2010 for season 10.

Early life
DelGrosso was born in Denver, Colorado. A self-described "Utah County Mormon", she was introduced to dance by her mother, Kim, who co-owns a dance studio with Alex and Robin Murillo 'Center Stage Performing Arts Studio" in Orem, Utah where DelGrosso has worked as an instructor for six years.

DelGrosso is the fourth of eight children. She has two older brothers, one older sister, and four younger sisters. Her five sisters are also dancers. She performed with her sisters, Averie Michelle, Afton Skye, Autumn, Amber and Abrea Danielle, as a troupe in a third season results show the week after DelGrosso and partner Harry Hamlin were eliminated. Afton competed on the eighth season of Dancing with the Stars in a pro dancer competition to win a spot as a professional in the show's ninth season, but did not make past the third week of competition (four weeks in total).

Career
With Jonathan Gulledge, amateur dance partner, DelGrosso has won several Amateur Ten Dance titles.

She partnered professionally with Rick Robinson- her coach from the age of eleven, on the professional Latin circuit before retiring shortly before Dancing with the Stars.

In 2006, DelGrosso guest starred on The Suite Life of Zack & Cody as Lori, one of the character's dance partners. She is part of a DVD titled Dancing With The Stars: Cardio Dance along with Kym Johnson and Maksim Chmerkovskiy.

Personal life
A bio on ABC's website during Season 1 of Dancing with the Stars stated that DelGrosso's height is 5'3".

On October 21, 2006, DelGrosso married Mike Costa, a field producer for Dancing with the Stars.

On February 20, 2007, DelGrosso announced that she and her husband were expecting their first child. As a result, she would not be able to perform on the fourth season of Dancing with the Stars. On July 27, 2007, DelGrosso gave birth to a son. On July 24, 2009, DelGrosso gave birth to son Enoch Daniel at 6:11 pm. In November 2011, DelGrosso gave birth to a daughter. On December 20, 2014, DelGrosso gave birth to son Samuel.

Ashly comes from the same dance studio as Jaymz Tuaileva, Julianne Hough, Derek Hough, Chelsie Hightower, and Jared Murillo.

Dancing accolades
Champion, Professional Rising Star Latin - Holiday Dance Classic, Las Vegas, Nevada
Semi-Finalist, World Professional Rising Star Latin Championships
Finalist, Professional Rising Star Latin - U.S. DanceSport Championships
Two-Time Champion, U.S. Youth International Ten Dance
Amateur Ten Dance Champion
U.S. Youth Standard Champion

Track record on Dancing with the Stars
In Season 1, DelGrosso partnered with musician and New Kids on the Block singer Joey McIntyre, coming in third place.
In Season 2, she and rap star Master P came in seventh. The pair received the lowest scores ever given on the show, and were at the bottom of the leader board every week of competition.
Also on Season 2, she and host Tom Bergeron danced a Quickstep, though it was not for scores or votes. Len Goodman said part of the dance could have been on America's Funniest Home Videos.
DelGrosso and celebrity partner Harry Hamlin were eliminated on third week of Season 3 of Dancing with the Stars, coming in ninth.
She was on the 100th episode of Dancing With the Stars.
Her sister Afton participated in a competition held during Season 8 to be a professional on the following season.
In Season 10, DelGrosso appeared with astronaut Buzz Aldrin. She returned for her fourth season after being absent for the previous six seasons. She and Aldrin were eliminated on April 6, 2010, coming in tenth.

Celebrity partners

Performances
With celebrity partner Joey McIntyre: 21.3

With celebrity partner Master P: 12.5

With celebrity partner Harry Hamlin: 20.0

With celebrity partner Buzz Aldrin: 13.0

References

External links
DelGrosso's website
Dancing with the Stars website
Center Stage

1982 births
Living people
American ballroom dancers
American female dancers
People from Denver
People from Orem, Utah
Latter Day Saints from Colorado
Latter Day Saints from Utah
Participants in American reality television series
21st-century American women